Paul Murphy (born 13 April 1983) is an Irish People Before Profit–Solidarity politician who has been a Teachta Dála (TD) for the Dublin South-West constituency since the 2014 Dublin South-West by-election. He served as a Member of the European Parliament (MEP) for the Dublin constituency from 2011 to 2014.

He was previously a member of the Socialist Party and Solidarity, but left in September 2019 to form a new party, RISE. In February 2021, RISE joined People Before Profit as a network, and Murphy became a TD for the party.

Early and personal life
Murphy grew up in Goatstown, a suburb of Dublin. He attended St Kilian's German School in Clonskeagh and later the Institute Of Education on Leeson Street. His father Kieran Murphy was a senior manager at the Irish division of Mars. His uncle Michael Murphy was a journalist and broadcaster at RTÉ. His family is originally from Castlebar, County Mayo. He studied for the Leaving Certificate at the Institute of Education, before going on to graduate from University College Dublin with a degree in law in 2004. He joined the Socialist Party in 2001. In 2004, he ran unsuccessfully, for President of the UCD Students' Union. Murphy also worked in the European Parliament as a political advisor to the MEP Joe Higgins.

A 2008 short film described him as a full-time activist for the Socialist Party. It followed his involvement in protests against cutbacks at Tallaght Hospital, during the Irish financial crisis. He was also active in Free Education for Everyone, a group that campaigned against the reintroduction of fees for third-level education in Ireland. In 2009, he worked on a PhD thesis titled Does socialist law exist?.

He was a member of the Socialist Party National Committee from 2001 and the National Executive Committee until 2010.

Murphy's partner is Jess Spear, and their first child was born in 2023.

European Parliament: 2011–2014

Murphy replaced Joe Higgins in the European Parliament after Higgins was elected to Dáil Éireann at the 2011 general election. Murphy sat as a full member on the European Parliament Committee on International Trade and as a substitute on the Employment and Social Affairs and Petitions committees. He was also a full member of the South Asia delegation and a substitute on the Central Asia delegation.

In 2011, Murphy participated in Freedom Flotilla II, which attempted to breach Israel's blockade of the Gaza Strip. In August 2011, he visited the "No TAV" Italian campaign against the Turin–Lyon high-speed railway. A supporter of the Shell to Sea campaign, in August 2011, he and others were forcibly removed from a protest by Gardaí. A complaint was submitted to the Garda Ombudsman alleging unreasonable use of force. In early November 2011, Murphy was reported to be part of another Gaza flotilla described as a humanitarian mission. Israeli forces boarded the ship on 4 November and imprisoned Murphy and all the other activists on board, with one of them saying this was carried out in a "violent and dangerous" manner. Israel deported Murphy on 11 November.

In 2012, Murphy set up the website ScamBridge.org for people wishing to share their experiences of the government's JobBridge scheme. In June 2013, he travelled to Istanbul, Turkey, to speak with activists participating in the Gezi Park protests. In 2013 while discussing the Israel-Palestine conflict, Murphy argued that "Palestinians have a right to defend themselves against that aggression and that may involve armed defence against soldiers" 

Murphy stood for re-election at the 2014 European Parliament election, at which he lost his seat. During the campaign he put his election posters on display before the official campaign start date, a move which risked fines of up to €150,000. He said "people wouldn't be bothered" and defended the move as a response to Fianna Fáil candidate Mary Fitzpatrick, who had also put up her posters early. Dún Laoghaire–Rathdown County Council and South Dublin County Council forced him to remove them. During the campaign, the Broadcasting Authority of Ireland (BAI) upheld a complaint against the Irish state broadcaster RTÉ which excluded Murphy from a report on the findings of a Sunday Business Post/Red C opinion poll on a news programme which they aired on 3 May 2014.

Dáil Éireann: 2014–present
Murphy was elected to Dáil Éireann for the Anti-Austerity Alliance, at the 2014 Dublin South-West by-election.

As a TD for the Anti-Austerity Alliance and member of the Socialist Party, Murphy took a leading role in the We Won't Pay campaign, an anti-water charges organisation advocating non-payment. He spoke at many rallies and protests against both the charges and the Fine Gael-Labour Party coalition government. His role during a protest against Tánaiste Joan Burton, in Jobstown, Dublin on 15 November 2014, brought criticism from some quarters after Burton's car was blocked, and she was unable to leave it for over two hours. Afterward, Murphy distanced himself from the actions of some protesters but defended the right to peaceful protest.

On 9 February 2015, he was arrested by Gardaí at his home, in relation to the Jobstown protest, and taken into custody along with three other anti-austerity activists. He was released without charge that afternoon.

On 12 August 2015, Paul Reynolds reported on RTÉ's Nine O'Clock News bulletin that Murphy and others would be charged and that trials would occur in the Circuit Court, where penalties are harsher, instead of the District Court. On 15 September 2015, Murphy was served a summons by the Gardaí on charges of false imprisonment of Joan Burton and her assistant. On 29 June 2017, Murphy and five other defendants, including Solidarity Councillors Kieran Mahon and Mick Murphy, were found not guilty of all charges.

Murphy was re-elected to the Dáil for the Dublin South-West constituency at the 2016 general election, as a member of the AAA–PBP grouping. He left the Socialist Party in September 2019, but did not leave the parliamentary group (known since 2017 as Solidarity–People Before Profit).

On 30 September 2019, Murphy announced a new political group called RISE (Radical Internationalist Socialist Environmentalist). He was re-elected at the 2020 general election as a RISE candidate.

In February 2021, Murphy became a member of People Before Profit after RISE's entry into the party.

Murphy has advocated in favour of Ireland's neutrality. In April 2022, he defended the decision of People Before Profit TDs not applauding Volodymyr Zelenskyy's address to the Dáil.

In September 2022, Murphy was assaulted by protesters outside Leinster House while leaving the Dáíl.

References

External links

1983 births
Living people
People Before Profit–Solidarity TDs
Alumni of University College Dublin
Irish tax resisters
Members of the 31st Dáil
Members of the 32nd Dáil
Members of the 33rd Dáil
MEPs for the Republic of Ireland 2009–2014
Prisoners and detainees of the Republic of Ireland
Socialist Party (Ireland) MEPs
People educated at St Kilian's German School
People educated at the Institute of Education (Dublin)